Mirza Nasir-ud-din Masood (23 April 1906 – 21 September 1991) was an Indian field hockey player who competed in the 1936 Summer Olympics.

In 1936 he was a member of the Indian field hockey team, which won the gold medal. He played one match  as halfback.

In 1948, Masood became private secretary to India's first Minister of Education, Abul Kalam Azad. He was temporarily released from that role in 1952 when he was appointed the UNESCO Mission Chief to Indonesia, where he remained until 1957. Following Azad's death in 1958, Jawaharlal Nehru successively appointed Masood as Advisor on Physical Education and Recreation, Consul General responsible for Muscat and Oman, the Emirates, and Bahrain, and Ambassador to Saudi Arabia. Upon his return to India in 1964, he was made secretary of the Central Waqf Board by Lal Bahadur Shastri.

Masood retired to Delhi in 1968 with his wife Atiya. He died in 1991 and was buried in Nizamuddin cemetery.

References

External links

MN Masud at twf.org

1906 births
1991 deaths
20th-century Indian Muslims
Field hockey players from Delhi
Olympic field hockey players of India
Field hockey players at the 1936 Summer Olympics
Indian male field hockey players
Olympic gold medalists for India
Olympic medalists in field hockey
Medalists at the 1936 Summer Olympics